Úsobí is a market town in Havlíčkův Brod District in the Vysočina Region of the Czech Republic. It has about 700 inhabitants.

Administrative parts
Villages of Chyška and Kosovy are administrative parts of Úsobí.

Geography
It lies in the Křemešník Highlands. There is a set of ponds fed by the Úsobský brook.

History
The first written mention of Úsobí is from 1307. In 1789, the village was promoted to a market town.

Economy
There was a 220-year tradition of glass manufacturing, commencing in 1779, with the initial site being the creation of a glass grinder underneath a pond.

Transport
The D1 motorway runs through the southern part of the municipal territory.

Sights
The Church of Saints Peter and Paul was originally a Gothic building from the 13th century, rebuilt to its current form in 1759–1760.

References

External links

Market towns in the Czech Republic
Populated places in Havlíčkův Brod District